Onthophagus depressus, the flat African dung beetle, is a species of dung beetle in the family Scarabaeidae.

The IUCN conservation status of Onthophagus depressus is "LC", least concern, with no immediate threat to the species' survival. The IUCN status was reviewed in 2013.

References

Further reading

 

Scarabaeinae
Articles created by Qbugbot
Beetles described in 1871